The possibility of accession of Papua New Guinea to the Association of Southeast Asian Nations is currently a matter of discussion.

Background
As early as 1987, Papua New Guinea's membership in the Pacific Islands Forum (PIF) was viewed as an obstacle to its joining ASEAN. In 2009, the country asked for the support of the Philippines in its ASEAN bid, however, no official response was heard as it was election season. The incumbent conservative Filipino administration which Papua New Guinea contacted and supported, dramatically lost to a more liberal administration in the 2010 Philippine election. 

Indonesia is the only ASEAN member supporting Papua New Guinea's membership. A grassroots level of support exists in the Philippines, although there is caution due to the country's discriminatory policies on human rights, notably on LGBT rights and the issue of West Papua. Singapore, Malaysia, and Brunei have shown dissatisfaction over Papua New Guinea's economic status which has hindered its acceptance into ASEAN. Laos and Myanmar have no official position in regards to the country's ASEAN application.

Papua New Guinea has enjoyed observer status in ASEAN since 1976. Benefits Papua New Guinea has cited to ASEAN members from the country's accession might include tapping into Papua New Guinea's lead industries such as oil and gas, mining and seafood.

Issues
Violent crime, political instability, poor infrastructure, discriminatory laws, and unskilled labor are obstacles preventing Papua New Guinea from joining, as well as the fact that the country is closer, culturally and geographically, to the Pacific islands to its east and that it is historically and financially tied more closely to Australia in the south.

See also
 Accession of East Timor to the Association of Southeast Asian Nations
 Enlargement of the Association of Southeast Asian Nations

References

Foreign relations of Papua New Guinea
Papua New Guinea